Margo Morgan (born 29 December 1929) is a British gymnast. She competed in seven events at the 1952 Summer Olympics.

References

1929 births
Living people
British female artistic gymnasts
Olympic gymnasts of Great Britain
Gymnasts at the 1952 Summer Olympics
Place of birth missing (living people)